Adhikar is a 1971 Indian Hindi-language drama film, directed by S.M. Sagar and written by Salim–Javed. The film stars Ashok Kumar, Nanda and Deb Mukherjee in the main roles.

Cast
 Ashok Kumar as Barrister Shukla
 Nanda as Meera
 Deb Mukherjee as Shyam
 Nazima as Radha
 Pran as Shikari Banne Khan Bhopali
 Raj Mehra as Shiv Charan Sharma
 Ratnamala as Parvati Sharma
 Rajnish as Rajan Shukla 
 Kishen Mehta as Dr. Kailash
 Shivraj as Doctor
 Brahmachari as Deepak
 Shammi as Rajan's Mother
 Tabassum as Rekha Shukla
 Helen as Dancer

Soundtrack
Lyrics were provided by Ramesh Pant.

References

External links
 

1971 films
1970s Hindi-language films
1971 drama films
Films scored by R. D. Burman
Films with screenplays by Salim–Javed
Indian drama films
Hindi-language drama films